Songs of Love and Parting is a folk album released in 1981 by Robin Williamson.

This album was the first since Myrrh to not include his Merry Band. One notable track, "For Mr. Thomas", was a tribute to the Welsh bard and would later be covered by Van Morrison.

The 2005 CD re-release by Gott Discs includes five bonus poetry tracks: "Selected Writings". The "Selected Writings" were poems and songs by Williamson released on cassette, but were only ever available in concert.

Track listing 
"Verses in Stewart Street"
"For Mr Thomas"
"Fare Thee Well Sweet Mally"
"Return No More"
"Tarry Wool"
"For Three of Us"
"Sigil"
"Flower of the Briar"
"The Forming of Blodeuwedd"
"Gwydion's Dream"
"Verses at Balwearie Tower"
"A Night at Ardpatrick"
"The Parting Glass"

Personnel 
Robin Williamson – Vocal, harp, guitar, shawm, whistle, accordion, harmonium, bagpipes, percussion, cittern, glass harp
Carol Shive – Violin
David Campbell – Viola
Jesse Elrich – Cello
Mike Garson – Harpsichord
Bernie Kirsh – Hunting horn
Judy Gameral – Hammered dulcimer

References

1981 albums
Robin Williamson albums
Cultural depictions of Dylan Thomas